Nehbandan (also Romanized as Nehbandān and Nahbandan; also known as Neh) (Neh-bahn-dahn) is a city in, and the capital of, Nehbandan County, South Khorasan Province, Iran. At the 2006 census, its population was 15,998, grouped into 3,817 families.

Nehbandan is located at an altitude of 1196 meters above sea level, and the heights of the north of this city reach 2500 meters above sea level. Nehbandan is located near the central desert of Iran. Precious stones in mines along with agriculture is another reason for the importance of Nehbandan. The people of Nehbandan are Parthians and Aryans who have lived in this area since pre-Islamic times. Nehbandan climate is classified as hot and dry due to its proximity to the central desert of Iran.

References 

Populated places in Nehbandan County

Cities in South Khorasan Province